USS Nevada (SSBN-733) is a United States Navy  ballistic missile submarine that has been in commission since 1986. She is the fourth ship of the U.S. Navy to be named for Nevada, the 36th state.

Construction and commissioning
The contract to build Nevada was awarded to the Electric Boat Division of General Dynamics Corporation in Groton, Connecticut, on 7 January 1981 and her keel was laid down there on 8 August 1983.  She was launched on 14 September 1985 sponsored by Mrs. Carol Laxalt, the wife of United States Senator Paul Laxalt of Nevada, and commissioned on 16 August 1986, with Captain F.W. Rohm in command of the Blue Crew and Captain William Stone in command of the Gold Crew.

Service history

During the night of 1–2 August 2006, Nevada was operating in the Strait of Juan de Fuca when she snagged and broke the 500-foot (150-metre) towline between the tug Phyllis Dunlap and one of two barges carrying empty containers that Phyllis Dunlap was towing from Honolulu, Hawaii, to Seattle, Washington. Fiberglass portions of Nevadas sail were damaged, and a second tug had to recover the drifting barge.

In both 2005 and 2006, Nevadas crew was awarded with the Battle Efficiency Award (Battle "E").  This award is given to the best submarine in its respective submarine squadron and is determined based on performance in inspections for tactical readiness and nuclear reactor safety, among other factors.

In February 2008, Nevada entered Puget Sound Naval Shipyard and Intermediate Maintenance Facility, Bremerton Site for a regularly scheduled Engineering Refueling Overhaul. The 'Green' crew worked for nearly 30 months on the refit and refuel until they were separated back to the 'Gold' and 'Blue' crews on 21 July 2010 in preparation for workups and sea trials.

Nevada was awarded the 2018 Omaha Trophy on 21 August 2019.  The Blue and Gold crews received the trophy to recognize their high standards of performance in the command's mission areas. The ballistic missile submarine has been regarded as "one of the US Navy's most powerful weapons" in 2022.

References

External links

 

Ships built in Groton, Connecticut
Ohio-class submarines
Cold War submarines of the United States
Nuclear submarines of the United States Navy
United States submarine accidents
Ballistic missile submarines
1985 ships
Submarines of the United States